Miss Universe 1982, the 31st Miss Universe pageant, was held on 26 July 1982 at the Coliseo Amauta in Lima, Peru. It was the first time in the pageant's history that the event was held in South America. Seventy-seven contestants competed in the pageant. Karen Dianne Baldwin of Canada was crowned by Irene Saez of Venezuela. This is the first time Canada won the pageant.

Results

Placements

Final Competition

Special Awards

Order Of Announcements

Top 12

Top 5

Contestants
  – María Alejandra Basile
  – Noriza Antonio Helder
  – Lou Ann Ronchi
  – Elisabeth Kawan
  – Ava Marilyn Burke
  – Marie-Pierre Lemaitre
  – Sharon Kay Auxilliou
  – Heather Ross
  – Sandra Villaroel
  – Celice Pinto Márques da Silva
  – Luce Dahlia Hodge
  – Karen Baldwin
  – Maureen Theresa Lewis
  – Jenny Purto Arab †
  – Nadya Santacruz
  – Liliana Corella Espinoza
  – Minerva Ranila Heiroms
  – Tina Maria Nielsen
  – Soraya Morey
  – Jacqueline Burgos
  – Jeanette Marroquín
  – Della Frances Dolan
  – Sari Kaarina Aspholm
  – Martine Philipps
  – Kerstin Natalie Paeserack
  – Tina Roussou
  – Lydia Galin
  – Patty Chong Kerkos
  – Edith Whitbeck
  – Brigitte Diereckx
  – Eva Lissethe Barahona
  – Angie Leung
  – Gudrun Moller
  – Pamela Chaudry Singh
  – Sri Yulyanti
  – Geraldine Mary McGrory
  – Deborah Naomi Hess
  – Cinzia Fiordeponti
  – Eri Okuwaki
  – Sun-hee Park
  – Siti Rohani Wahid
  – Rita Falzon
  – Corine Soler
  – María del Carmen López
  – Deseree Anita Kotze
  New Caledonia – Lenka Topalovitch
  – Sandra Helen Dexter
  – Sheryl Sonoda Sizemore
  – Janett Krefting
  – Isora de Lourdes López
  – Moi Eli
  – Maris Villalba
  – María Francesca Zaza Reinoso
  – Maria Isabel Lopez
  – Ana Maria Valdiz
  – Lourdes Milagros Mantero Hormazábal
  – Marie Micheline Ginon
  – Georgina Kearney
  - Judicia Nonis
  – Odette Octavia Scrooby
  – Cristina Pérez Cottrell
  – Ann Monica Tradigo
  – Liana Elviara Brown
  – Vanessa de Vries
  – Anna Kari Maria Bergström
  – Jeannette Linkenheill
  – Nipaporn Tarapanich
  – Noxolisi Mji
  – Suzanne Traboulay
  – Canan Kakmaci
  – Jacqueline Astwood
  – Silvia Beatriz Vila Abavián
  – Terri Utley
  – Ingeborg Hendricks
  – Ana Teresa Oropeza
  – Michelle Donelly
  – Ivy Evelyn Warner

Judges 
 David Merrick
 Cicely Tyson - actress
 Mario Vargas
 Beulah Quo - actress
 Ron Duguay - NHL player and actor
 Franco Nero - actor
 Peter Marshall - TV game show host
 Carole Bouquet - actress
 Dong Kingman
 Ira von Furstenberg
 David Copperfield - American magician
 Gladys Zender - Miss Universe 1957 winner

Notes

Debut
  New Caledonia

Returns
Last competed in 1979:
 
 
Last competed in 1980:

Withdrawals
  – Sylvia Spanias Nitsa - she was disqualified after being discovered that she was actually a British citizen from London, England
 
 
 
  Tahiti

Did not Compete
  – Dolly Michelle El-Koury

References

1982
1982 beauty pageants
1982 in Peru
Beauty pageants in Peru
Events in Lima
July 1982 events in South America